Santa Maria del Suffragio  is a Baroque, Roman Catholic parish church located in central Acireale in the region of Sicily of Italy. The church is located at the end of Via Romero, where the strada del la Marina leads through an opening in the town walls to the Fortezza del Tocco and to the seaside.

History and description
Construction of the original church at this site was pursued between 1634 and 1638, commissioned by Giuseppe Costarella, and also patronized by this port-side neighborhood, then populated by fishermen, artisans and shopkeepers, and a local Archconfraternity titled della Domenica. Spared destruction by the 1693 earthquake, in the early 17th century, the interior was refurbished by Pietro Paolo Vasta, who painted the frescoes on the walls and ceilings. In 1905 the church was declared a national monument.

References

17th-century Roman Catholic church buildings in Italy
Roman Catholic churches in Acireale